Hypatopa pica is a moth in the family Blastobasidae. It is found in Costa Rica.

The length of the forewings is 6.8–8.5 mm. The forewings have brown scales tipped with white intermixed with white, dark-brown scales, and brownish-orange scales tipped with white. The hindwings are translucent pale grey.

Etymology
The specific name is derived from Latin pica (meaning a jay or magpie).

References

Moths described in 2013
Hypatopa